The Diocese of Guantánamo-Baracoa is a particular church of the Latin Church of the Catholic Church, encompassing the municipality of Baracoa and the surrounding Guantánamo Province in Cuba. It was erected 24 January 1998 from the Archdiocese of Santiago de Cuba, to which it suffragan.

Ordinaries
Carlos Jesús Patricio Baladrón Valdés (1998 - 2006) - Bishop Emeritus
Wilfredo Pino Estévez (2006 - 2016), appointed Archbishop of Camagüey
Silvano Herminio Pedroso Montalvo (2018 -

External links and references
Diocesis de Guantanamo Baracoa official site (in Spanish)

Guantanamo-Baracoa
Guantánamo-Baracoa
Guantánamo-Baracoa
Baracoa
Guantánamo Province
Roman Catholic Ecclesiastical Province of Santiago de Cuba